Chandra Kalindi Roy-Henriksen is a scholar of indigenous rights and the former chair of the Indigenous Peoples and Development Branch/Secretariat of the Permanent Forum on Indigenous Issues (IPDB/SPFII), an entity that describes its main function as supporting the work of the United Nations Permanent Forum on Indigenous Issues.

Works

References

United Nations Secretariat
Living people
Chakma people
Bangladeshi Buddhists
Year of birth missing (living people)